The 1956 McDonald Chapel tornado was a deadly weather event that took place during the afternoon of April 15, 1956, across the Greater Birmingham area in Jefferson County, Alabama, with damage most severe in McDonald Chapel. Retroactively rated an F4 on the Fujita scale, which was not invented until 1971, the tornado killed 25 people and injured 200 others. While only two known tornadoes touched down across the Southeastern United States (the other occurred in northern Georgia) on that day, the Birmingham tornado produced major devastation across areas west and north of downtown Birmingham.

Meteorological synopsis 
At 5:15 a.m. CST on April 15, the U.S. Weather Bureau office in Birmingham, Alabama, issued a bulletin that warned of the possibility that a "tornado or two" would touch down in an area covering western Tennessee, northern Mississippi, and northern Alabama—namely, Lauderdale, Limestone, Lawrence, Colbert, and Morgan Counties, plus parts of Marion, Winston, Cullman, and Madison Counties. An update at noon local time highlighted the prospects for severe thunderstorms over west-central Alabama between 1:00–7:00 p.m. CST.

Confirmed tornadoes

April 14 event

April 15 event

McDonald Chapel/Sayreton, Alabama 

The tornado started shortly before 3:00 PM CDT in Pleasant Grove, where a tornado "roar" was heard. Damage between Pleasant Grove and McDonald Chapel indicated that trees were felled in a single direction, so the damage was not listed as tornadic at first, but was considered part of the tornado in posthumous analysis. As it passed through McDonald Chapel, eyewitnesses described the tornado funnel as appearing filled with fire and smoke. Many homes in McDonald Chapel were leveled, several of which were swept completely away. The most intense damage appeared to be F5 in intensity, but an F4 rating was rewarded because the homes were very poorly constructed. One of the homes reportedly had almost all of its brick foundation swept away, and a few larger homes were also leveled. The tornado continued across parts of, Edgewater, Pratt City, Fultondale, Village Creek, and Tarrant before lifting northwest of Trussville, near the Jefferson-St. Clair County line. The tornado passed just one to two miles north of downtown Birmingham as well as the Birmingham-Shuttlesworth International Airport. About 400 homes across northern Jefferson County were either damaged or destroyed. Most of the 25 deaths occurred at McDonald Chapel.

The tornado event was similar to other deadly tornadoes on April 4, 1977, April 8, 1998, and April 27, 2011. The 1977 and 1998 tornadoes were rated F5, and killed 22 and 32 people, respectively, across most of the same areas that were hit in 1956. The 2011 event was rated high-end EF4, and killed 20 people in the area along with 44 others in Tuscaloosa earlier along its path. With 25 fatalities, the McDonald Chapel F4 was the deadliest tornado of 1956, surpassing the Grand Rapids F5 that killed 18 people on April 3.

See also 
 List of North American tornadoes and tornado outbreaks

Notes

References

Bibliography 
 
 

Tornadoes in Alabama
Tornadoes of 1956
F4 tornadoes by date
McDonald Chapel tornado
McDonald Chapel tornado